Seedies and Kroomen (also Kroumen or Krumen) were African sailors recruited locally into the British Royal Navy in the 19th and early 20th century.

The Seedies − from the Hindi word sidi − were mostly employed in less skilled jobs. They were Muslim, and the navy recruited them from ports on the Indian Ocean, primarily from Zanzibar and the Seychelles. Some seem to have been ex-slaves. A later example is the armed merchant cruiser HMS Himalaya, aboard whom seedies served from 1916 until 1918.

The Kroomen were experienced fishermen from the Kroo or Kru tribe in Sotta Krou, in what is now Liberia in West Africa. Because of their knowledge of the west African coast they were sometimes employed as pilots.

Horatio Bridge, a United States Navy officer in the 1840s, described them as follows:

Seedies and Kroomen normally served on three-year contracts. When released from their contract many of these people settled in various parts of the British Empire.

George Bernard Shaw's play Captain Brassbound's Conversion includes extras playing "Krooboys" in a ship's crew.

References 

History of the Royal Navy
Kru people